South Yemen competed as the Yemen Democratic Republic at the 1988 Summer Olympics in Seoul, South Korea. It was the only time that the nation would compete at the Olympic Games. After unification with North Yemen, the nation would later return as Yemen at the 1992 Summer Olympics.

Medal tables

Medals by Games

Competitors
The following is the list of number of competitors in the Games.

Athletics

Men
Track & road events

Boxing

References

External links
 
 
 
 Official Olympic Reports

Olympics
Nations at the 1988 Summer Olympics
Olympics
1988
Oly